Natalya Vladimirovna Komarova (born 21 October 1955 in Yazvo, Pskov Oblast), is a Russian politician who, serves as Governor of Khanty-Mansi since 2010. She previously served as in State Duma between 2001 and 2010, where for six years she headed the powerful Natural Resources Committee. Prior to that, she held a number of statewide and local positions in Khanty-Mansi and Yamalo-Nenets.

A member of United Russia, she is currently the only female Governor in Russia.

Education and career
Natalya Komarova is a graduate of the Kommunarsk Mining-Metallurgical Institute (now Donbas State Technical University). In 1980 she moved from Donbas to Novy Urengoy, where she became lieutenant inspector. 

In 1992 Komarova took office as Deputy Mayor of Novy Urengoy and became the Mayor of the regionally significant town two years later. She was chosen by the Governor of Yamalo-Nenets, Yuri Neyolov, as his deputy in 2000. In that capacity, she headed the Regional Economic Council. During those years, Komarova also served as an educator and docent of the Yamalsky Oil and Gas Institute, a department within Tyumen State Oil and Gas University. 

In December 2001, Komarova filled a vacated seat in the State Duma, where she quickly gained influence and, in 2004, was chosen as Chair of the Committee on Natural Resources and Management, one year after being elected to a full term in the Duma. She was re-elected in 2007. 

On 8 February 2010, Komarova's credentials were endorsed by the State Duma and Russian President Dmitry Medvedev to be appointed Governor of Khanty-Mansia, shortly after which she took office. She successfully ran for the position in 2015 after Russia re-adopted gubernatorial elections, a system that was previously abandoned ten years prior. Komarova was re-elected to another term in 2020.

Corruption
Natalia Komarova, governor of Khantys-Mansis district in Siberia was caught confiding in a mayor about the corruption scheme: .

References

1955 births
Living people
People from Gdovsky District
United Russia politicians
Governors of Khanty-Mansi Autonomous Okrug
21st-century Russian women politicians
Women heads of federal subjects of Russia
Third convocation members of the State Duma (Russian Federation)
Fourth convocation members of the State Duma (Russian Federation)
Fifth convocation members of the State Duma (Russian Federation)